Nobu Berkeley St is a restaurant located in London, England. The interior was designed by celebrated interior decorator David Collins with lighting by Isometrix. The restaurant previously held one star in the Michelin Guide, however this star was removed in the 2015 Guide. The restaurant is part - and was the first - of the international Nobu Restaurant group.

References

External links 
 Nobu Restaurants

Restaurants in London